Creamerie is a black comedy web series from New Zealand that launched in 2021 on TVNZ OnDemand. It explores a world in which nearly all men have died from a virus, and three friends, played by Perlina Lau, J.J. Fong, and Ally Xue, run a dairy farm under the watchful eye of Wellness, the local governing body. The series was created by Lau, Fong, Xue, and director Roseanne Liang.

Plot 
Alex, Jaime, and Pip are three friends living on a New Zealand dairy farm, eight years after all men on Earth have died from a mysterious virus. An organization called Wellness now runs their community and controls repopulation via lottery, using sperm saved from old sperm banks. The friends' lives are thrown into disarray when they encounter a man who they assume to be the only surviving man in the world. They eventually stumble upon a very disturbing lab where some of the very few surviving men are being held hostage, tied up to their chairs, gagged and naked, with pumping devices being attached to their genitals, raping and milking them to spermjack their semen to preserve their sperm for very limited human breeding.

Cast

Main
Ally Xue as Alex, an outspoken critic of the Wellness organization
J.J. Fong as Jaime, a mother mourning the loss of her husband and son
Perlina Lau as Pip, an optimist who works for the Wellness organization
Jay Ryan as Bobby, a man who has survived the virus believed to have killed every man on Earth
Tandi Wright as Lane, the head of Wellness

Recurring
Kim Crossman as Michelle
Nikki Si'ulepa as Constance
Helene Wong as Tilda
Rachel House as Doc Harvey
Yoson An as Jackson, Jaime's deceased husband
Renee Lyons as Viv
Brynley Stent as Lynley
Ava Diakhaby as Ada
Angella Dravid as Brandi
Keborah Torrance as Bernice
Sara Wiseman as Hunter

Episodes

Production 
Filming began in and around the Auckland region, including West Auckland, in 2020, but was paused after six weeks when lockdowns for the COVID-19 pandemic began. Filming resumed with the implementation of masks, social distancing, and other precautions, and was completed in September 2020.

In May 2022, Creamerie was renewed for a second season. Filming for Season 2 occurred from October 2022 to February 2023.

Reception 
Since the programme's premiere it has received critical acclaim, with critics praising the programme's humour, casting, unique premise, and for the programme's ability to maintain a deft balance between its humorous and dramatic aspects. Positive comparisons were made to Y: The Last Man and The Handmaid's Tale; with many critics calling the programme an inversion of the latter. Although recurring criticisms of the programme was that it needed to put a bit more emphasis on its dramatic moments given the nature of the story it is trying to tell and that it needed to provide more backstory.

Writing for The Sydney Morning Herald, Kylie Northover called Creamerie "masterful, with deadpan humour and a terrific cast."James Croot of Stuff NZ wrote a glowing review, stating "Creamerie delivers full-bodied and flavoured, adult humour with no trace of cheese." Chelsea McLaughlin from Mamamia gave the programme a positive review writing that "Creamerie builds a fascinating world and introduces us to three incredibly real, well-rounded characters in Alex, Jamie and Pip. It tackles some really dark topics and seems to know exactly when to lean in and lean out of its hilarity... but you'll be left thinking about it long after the final credits." In her rave review from Screenhub, Mel Campbell said "The plotting is surprisingly suspenseful, whipping up dollops of twists in every episode.... Ultimately, this speculative treat is intellectually substantial – and emotionally satisfying."

Creamerie won the NZ On Air Best Drama Series award at the 2021 New Zealand Television Awards.

References

External links

2020s New Zealand television series
2021 New Zealand television series debuts
2021 web series debuts
Comedy web series
Television shows filmed in New Zealand
Television shows set in New Zealand
Single-gender worlds